This is a list of diplomatic missions in Egypt.  At present, the capital city of Cairo hosts 140 embassies. Several other countries have ambassadors accredited from other regional capitals. Honorary consulates are excluded from this listing.

Diplomatic missions in Cairo

Embassies

Other delegations or missions 
 (Permanent Delegation to the Arab League)
 (Delegation)
 (Interests Section;  is protecting power)
 (Liaison Office)

Gallery

Embassies To open

Consulates General/Consulates

Alexandria

Aswan

Suez

Non-resident embassies 

Resident in Abu Dhabi, 
United Arab Emirates 

 
 

 
 

Resident in Kuwait City, Kuwait

Resident in Rabat, Morocco

 
 
 

Resident in elsewhere
 (Nairobi)
 (Kampala)
 (Riyadh)
 (Riyadh)
 (Amman)
 (Pretoria)
 (Abuja)
 (Riyadh)

Former embassies

Notes

See also 
 Foreign relations of Egypt
 List of diplomatic missions of Egypt
 Visa requirements for Egyptian citizens

References

External links 
 Egypt Diplomatic List

List
Diplomatic missions
Egypt